Julian Hansen (born 2 August 1963) is a retired Faroese football midfielder.

References

1963 births
Living people
Faroese footballers
Havnar Bóltfelag players
Argja Bóltfelag players
Association football midfielders
Faroe Islands international footballers
Faroese football managers